

A 
 Acoustic phonetics
 Active articulator
 Affricate
 Airstream mechanism
 Alexander John Ellis
 Alexander Melville Bell
 Alfred C. Gimson
 Allophone
 Alveolar approximant
 Alveolar click
 Alveolar consonant
 Alveolar ejective affricate
 Alveolar ejective
 Alveolar ejective fricative
 Alveolar flap
 Alveolar lateral approximant
 Alveolar lateral ejective affricate
 Alveolar lateral ejective fricative
 Alveolar lateral flap
 Alveolar nasal
 Alveolar ridge
 Alveolar trill
 Alveolo-palatal consonant
 Alveolo-palatal ejective fricative
 Apical consonant
 Approximant consonant
 Articulatory phonetics
 Aspirated consonant (◌ʰ)
 Auditory phonetics

B 
 Back vowel
 Basis of articulation
 Bernd J. Kröger
 Bilabial click
 Bilabial consonant
 Bilabial ejective
 Bilabial flap
 Bilabial nasal
 Bilabial trill
 Breathy voice

C 
 Cardinal vowel
 Central consonant
 Central vowel
 Checked vowel
 Click consonant
 Close back rounded vowel
 Close back unrounded vowel
 Close central rounded vowel
 Close central unrounded vowel
 Close front rounded vowel
 Close front unrounded vowel
 Close vowel
 Close-mid back rounded vowel
 Close-mid back unrounded vowel
 Close-mid central rounded vowel 
 Close-mid central unrounded vowel
 Close-mid front rounded vowel
 Close-mid front unrounded vowel
 Close-mid vowel
 Co-articulated consonant
 Coarticulation
 Comparison of ASCII encodings of the International Phonetic Alphabet
 Consonant
 Consonant cluster
 Continuant
 Creaky voice

D 
 Daniel Jones
 David Abercrombie
 Dental click
 Dental consonant
 Dental ejective
 Dental ejective fricative
 Dental nasal
 Diphthong
 Dorsal consonant

E 
 Eclipsis
 Ejective consonant
 Eli Fischer-Jørgensen
 Elision
 Epenthesis
 Epiglottal consonant
 Epiglottal flap
 Epiglottal plosive
 Epiglottal trill

F 
 Formant
 Fortis (phonetics)
 Fortis and lenis
 Free vowel
 Fricative consonant
 Front vowel

G 
 Gemination
 Georg Heike
 Glide
 Glottis
 Glottal consonant
 Glottalic consonant (ingressive, egressive)
 Glottal stop

H 
 Hard palate
 Henry Sweet
 High rising terminal
 Hiatus (linguistics)
 Hush consonant

I 
 Ian Maddieson
 Ilse Lehiste
 Implosive consonant
 Ingressive speech
 International Phonetic Alphabet
 International Phonetic Association
 Intonation

J 
 J. C. Catford
 John C. Wells
 John Laver
 John Local
 John Ohala
 John Samuel Kenyon

K 
 Kenneth Lee Pike
 Kenneth N. Stevens

L 
 Labialization
 Labial-palatal approximant
 Labial-palatal consonant
 Labial-velar approximant
 Labial-velar consonant
 Labial-velar nasal
 Labiodental approximant
 Labiodental consonant
 Labiodental ejective fricative
 Labiodental flap
 Labiodental nasal
 Lateral click
 Laminal consonant
 Lateral consonant
 Length (phonetics)
 Lenis
 Lexical stress
 Lilias Armstrong
 Linguolabial consonant
 Lips
 Liquid consonant
 List of consonants
 List of vowels
 Luciano Canepari
 Ludmilla A. Chistovich

M 
 Manner of articulation
 Mark Liberman
 Metathesis
 Mid central vowel
 Mid vowel
 Monophthong

N 
 Nasal consonant
 Nasal stop
 Nasal vowel
 Nasalization
 Near-close back rounded vowel
 Near-close front rounded vowel
 Near-close front unrounded vowel
 Near-close vowel
 Near-open central vowel
 Near-open front unrounded vowel
 Near-open vowel

O 
 Obsolete and nonstandard symbols in the International Phonetic Alphabet
 Occlusion
 Open back rounded vowel
 Open back unrounded vowel
 Open front rounded vowel
 Open front unrounded vowel
 Open vowel
 Open-mid back rounded vowel
 Open-mid back unrounded vowel
 Open-mid central rounded vowel
 Open-mid central unrounded vowel
 Open-mid front rounded vowel
 Open-mid front unrounded vowel
 Open-mid vowel
 Oral consonant

P 
 Palatal approximant
 Palatal click
 Palatal consonant
 Palatal ejective
 Palatal lateral approximant
 Palatal lateral ejective affricate
 Palatal lateral flap
 Palatal nasal
 Palatalization
 Palato-alveolar ejective affricate
 Palato-alveolar ejective fricative
 Pāṇini
 Passive articulator
 Peter Ladefoged
 Peter Roach (phonetician)
 Pharyngeal consonant
 Pharyngealization
 Philip Lieberman
 Phonation
 Phone
 Phoneme
 Phonetic palindrome
 Phonetic reversal
 Phonetics
 Phonetic transcription
 Pitch accent
 Place of articulation
 Plosive consonant
 Postalveolar consonant
 Postalveolar nasal
 Preaspiration
 Prenasalized consonant
 Prosody
 Pulmonic egressive

R 
 R-colored vowel
 Retroflex approximant
 Retroflex click
 Retroflex consonant
 Retroflex ejective
 Retroflex ejective affricate
 Retroflex ejective fricative
 Retroflex flap
 Retroflex nasal
 Retroflex lateral approximant
 Retroflex lateral flap
 Retroflex trill
 Rhotic consonant
 Rounded vowel

S 
 Sandhi
 SAMPA
 Semivowel
 Sibilant consonant
 Sj-sound
 Slack voice
Jennifer Smith (sociolinguist)
 Sociophonetics
 Sonorant
 Source–filter model of speech production
 Spectrogram
 Speech organ
 Speech perception
 Stress accent
 Stress (linguistics)
 Stricture
 Syllable
 Syncope

T 
 Table of vowels
 Tap or flap consonant
 Teeth
 Tenseness
 Tonal language
 Tone sandhi
 Tongue
 Trill consonant
 Triphthong

U 
 Unrounded vowel
 Uvula
 Uvular consonant
 Uvular ejective
 Uvular ejective affricate
 Uvular ejective fricative
 Uvular flap
 Uvular nasal
 Uvular Stop 
 Uvular trill

V 
 Velar approximant
 Velar consonant
 Velar ejective
 Velar ejective affricate
 Velar ejective fricative
 Velar lateral approximant
 Velar lateral ejective affricate
 Velar lateral flap
 Velar nasal
 Velaric egressive
 Velarization
 Velum
 Vocal cords
 Vocal stress
 Vocal tract
 Voice onset time
 Voiced alveolar affricate
 Voiced alveolar fricative
 Voiced alveolar implosive
 Voiced alveolar lateral affricate
 Voiced alveolar lateral fricative
 Voiced alveolar plosive
 Voiced alveolo-palatal affricate
 Voiced alveolo-palatal fricative
 Voiced bilabial fricative
 Voiced bilabial implosive
 Voiced bilabial plosive
 Voiced consonant
 Voiced dental affricate
 Voiced dental fricative,
 Voiced dental plosive
 Voiced epiglottal fricative
 Voiced glottal fricative
 Voiced implosive consonant
 Voiced labial-velar plosive
 Voiced labiodental affricate
 Voiced labiodental fricative
 Voiced labiodental plosive
 Voiced palatal affricate
 Voiced palatal fricative
 Voiced palatal implosive
 Voiced palatal plosive
 Voiced palato-alveolar affricate
 Voiced pharyngeal fricative
 Voiced postalveolar fricative
 Voiced retroflex affricate
 Voiced retroflex fricative
 Voiced retroflex implosive
 Voiced retroflex plosive
 Voiced uvular affricate
 Voiced uvular fricative
 Voiced uvular implosive
 Voiced uvular plosive
 Voiced velar affricate
 Voiced velar fricative
 Voiced velar implosive
 Voiced velar lateral affricate
 Voiced velar lateral fricative
 Voiced velar plosive
 Voiceless alveolar affricate
 Voiceless alveolar fricative
 Voiceless alveolar lateral affricate
 Voiceless alveolar lateral fricative
 Voiceless alveolar nasal
 Voiceless alveolar plosive
 Voiceless alveolo-palatal affricate
 Voiceless alveolo-palatal fricative
 Voiceless bilabial fricative
 Voiceless bilabial nasal
 Voiceless bilabial plosive
 Voiceless consonant
 Voiceless dental affricate
 Voiceless dental fricative
 Voiceless dental plosive
 Voiceless epiglottal fricative
 Voiceless glottal fricative
 Voiceless labial-velar fricative
 Voiceless labial-velar plosive
 Voiceless labiodental affricate
 Voiceless labiodental fricative
 Voiceless labiodental plosive
 Voiceless palatal affricate
 Voiceless palatal fricative
 Voiceless palatal lateral affricate
 Voiceless palatal lateral fricative
 Voiceless palatal nasal
 Voiceless palatal plosive
 Voiceless pharyngeal fricative
 Voiceless postalveolar affricate
 Voiceless postalveolar fricative
 Voiceless retroflex affricate
 Voiceless retroflex fricative
 Voiceless retroflex lateral fricative
 Voiceless retroflex nasal
 Voiceless retroflex plosive
 Voiceless retroflex trill
 Voiceless uvular affricate
 Voiceless uvular fricative
 Voiceless uvular plosive
 Voiceless velar affricate
 Voiceless velar fricative
 Voiceless velar lateral affricate
 Voiceless velar lateral fricative
 Voiceless velar nasal
 Voiceless velar plosive
 Voicing
 Vowel backness
 Vowel harmony
 Vowel height
 Vowel length
 Vowel reduction
 Vowel roundedness
 Vowel

W 
 Whispering

X 
 X-SAMPA

Y 
 Yi Tso-lin

Phonetics topics
Phonetics
Phonetics topics

eo:Listo de fonetikaj temoj
fr:Liste des notions utilisées en phonétique
vi:Thuật ngữ ngữ âm học